The Perth Lynx are an Australian professional basketball team based in Perth, Western Australia. The Lynx compete in the Women's National Basketball League (WNBL) and play their home games at Bendat Basketball Centre. For sponsorship reasons, they are known as the Northern Star Resources Perth Lynx.

The Lynx were established in 1988 as the Perth Breakers. After being owned and operated by Basketball Western Australia from 2001 to 2015, the Perth Wildcats took over ownership and operation of the team for a period of five years. In 2020, the license was transferred back to Basketball Western Australia. The Lynx have reached four WNBL Grand Finals, winning their only championship in 1992.

History

Perth Breakers 
The franchise debuted in the WNBL in 1988 as the Perth Breakers. After withdrawing midway through their second season in 1989, the Breakers returned to action in 1990. The team appeared in the WNBL finals every year between 1991 and 2000 except 1997, winning a championship in 1992 under coach Tom Maher. They also reached grand finals in 1993 and 1999.

Basketball WA's first ownership stint 
In 2001, the franchise came under the ownership of Basketball Western Australia. The team was subsequently rebranded as the Perth Lynx. In 2010, another rebrand saw the team become the West Coast Waves. In 14 seasons under Basketball WA, the team failed to make a finals appearance.

Perth Wildcats management 
In April 2015, the team's license was purchased by the Perth Wildcats and their chairman and owner Jack Bendat. The Wildcats subsequently brought back the Perth Lynx brand name. In the 2015–16 season, the Lynx qualified for the finals for the first time since 2000. They went on to reach the grand final, their first since 1999, where they lost 2–0 to the Townsville Fire.

In the 2017–18 season, the Lynx won 14 consecutive games throughout the season and finished on top of the ladder, before losing four matches in a row after enduring seven flights in eight days. They lost to Canberra and Townsville in the final weekend of the regular season and were then swept 2–0 by fourth-placed Melbourne in the semi-finals.

In March 2018, the licence agreement with the Wildcats was extended.

Basketball WA's second ownership stint 
In March 2020, the Perth Lynx's WNBL licence was transferred back to Basketball WA.

In the 2021–22 season, the Lynx finished in second place with an 11–5 record and reached the grand final, where they lost the series 2–1 to the Melbourne Boomers despite winning game one in Melbourne.

Season-by-season records

Source: Year By Year

Players

Current roster

Notable former players 
  Fiona Robinson
  Michele Timms
  Tully Bevilaqua
  Carly Wilson, (2006–2008)
  Angela Marino, (2006–07)
  Melissa Marsh, (2001–2005, 2006–2014)
  Rohanee Cox, (1998–2003, 2011–12)
  Betnijah Laney, (2015–16)
  Tessa Lavey, (2015–2017)
  Sami Whitcomb, (2015–2018)
  Courtney Williams, (2017–18)
  Antonia Farnworth, (2012–2019)
  Asia Taylor, (2018–19)
  Ariel Atkins, (2019–20)

Honour roll 

Source: Perth Lynx Achievements

References

External links

 Perth Lynx official website
 "Perth Lynx overcame a tough WNBL season but their finals campaign can be built on WAIS Rockets heritage" at thewest.com.au

 
Basketball teams established in 1988
1988 establishments in Australia
Basketball teams in Western Australia
Sporting clubs in Perth, Western Australia
Women's National Basketball League teams